Rosabal is a surname. Notable people with the surname include:

Liliamnis Rosabal (born 1999), Cuban handball player 
Silvio Rosabal (born 1963), Cuban rowing coxswain